Year 1068 (MLXVIII) was a leap year starting on Tuesday (link will display the full calendar) of the Julian calendar.

Events 
 By place 

 Byzantine Empire 
 January 1 – Empress Eudokia Makrembolitissa, wife of the late Emperor Constantine X, marries General Romanos Diogenes (a member of a prominent Cappadocian family) – who is proclaimed co-emperor as Romanos IV of the Byzantine Empire.
 Autumn – Romanos IV begins a campaign against the Seljuk Turks, leading a Byzantine expeditionary force (which is in poor condition). He is successful in recapturing the fortress city of Hieropolis (modern-day Manbij) near Aleppo in northern Syria.
 Winter – Romanos IV leaves a portion of his army as a rearguard at Melitene. The Byzantine garrison fails to check a Seljuk raid that manages to sack Amorium (penetrating deep in Byzantine territory). Romanos winters near Aleppo before returning to Constantinople.

 Europe 
 Norman conquest of southern Italy: Norman forces under Robert Guiscard (duke of Apulia and Calabria) lay siege to the Byzantine city of Bari.
 Battle of the Alta River: The Cumans defeat the Kievan Rus' forces of Grand Prince Iziaslav I, and his brothers Sviatoslav II and Vsevolod I.
 Kiev Uprising: The city of Kiev rebels against Iziaslav I, in the aftermath of the Kievan Rus' defeat against the Cumans.
 Rethra destruction: In Annals of Augsburg the slavic city is mentioned for the last time under the year 1068. It was captured by bishop Burchard, who destroyed their temple and abducted the sacred white horse living there.

 England 
 Siege of Exeter: Norman forces under King William I (the Conqueror) take the city of Exeter after a siege of 18-days.
 William I begins a campaign in the East Midlands to put down the rebellions at Nottingham, Stafford, Lincoln and York.
 Edgar the Ætheling takes refuge with King Malcolm III of Scotland along with Edgar's sister Margaret, who marries King Malcolm.
 May 11 – William I brings his wife Matilda of Flanders to England. She is crowned queen in Westminster Abbey.

 Africa 
 September – Zaynab an-Nafzawiyyah marries Abu Bakr ibn Umar, leader of the Almoravids, and becomes his queen and co-regent.

 Asia 
 Spring – Emperor Yi Zong of the Western Xia (or Xi Xia) dies after a 19-year reign. He is succeeded by his 7-year-old son Hui Zong, who assumes the throne (until 1086).
 May 22 – Emperor Go-Reizei dies after a 23-year reign, leaving no direct heirs to the throne. He is succeeded by his brother Go-Sanjō as the 71st emperor of Japan.

 By topic 

 Geology 
 March 18 – An earthquake affects the Near East, with a maximum Mercalli intensity of IX (Violent). The shock has a magnitude greater than 7, and leaves about 20,000 people dead.

Births 
 August 1 – Taizu (Aguda), emperor of the Jin Dynasty (d. 1123)
 Abu al-Salt, Moorish astronomer and polymath (approximate date)
 Ermengarde of Anjou, duchess of Aquitaine and Brittany (d. 1146)
 Haakon Magnusson (Toresfostre), king of Norway (d. 1095)
 Henry I, king of England (approximate date) (d. 1135)
 Peter I, king of Aragon (approximate date)
 Robert de Ferrers, 1st Earl Derby (d. 1139)

Deaths 
 January 11 – Egbert I, margrave of Meissen
 May 22 – Go-Reizei, emperor of Japan (b. 1025)
 November 10 – Agnes of Burgundy, duchess of Aquitaine
 Abulchares, Byzantine general and catepan 
 Ali ibn Yusuf al-Ilaqi, Persian physician
 Argyrus, Lombard nobleman and general 
 Böritigin, ruler of Transoxiana (Kara-Khanid Khanate)
 Choe Chung, Korean Confucian scholar (b. 984)
 Eadnoth the Constable, English landowner
 Ephraim ibn al-Za'faran, Jewish physician
 Ralph the Staller, English nobleman
 William IV (or Guillem), French nobleman
 William of Montreuil, Italo-Norman duke 
 Yi Zong, emperor of Western Xia (b. 1047)
 Vijayaditya VI, king of the Eastern Chalukyas (unconfirmed)

References